A runaway is a minor or (depending upon the local jurisdiction) a person under a specified age who has left their parents or legal guardians without permission. Statistics show that females are more likely to run away than males.

Causes
Current studies suggest that the primary cause of youth homelessness is family dysfunction in the form of parental neglect, physical or sexual abuse, family substance use disorder, and family violence. Nearly half of runaway youths report that at least one of their parents struggles with alcohol addiction, and at least one third reported a parent struggling with drug addiction.

Studies also show that 89% of child runaways were encouraged to do so by their peers.

Consequences of running away
Runaways have an elevated risk of destructive behavior. Approximately fifty percent of runaways experience difficulties with schooling; including dropping out, expulsion, or suspension. Running away can increase the risk of delinquency for adolescents, and expose them to the risk of victimization. There have been many studies in multiple countries about "street children"—youth who have run away and are presently homeless—showing that they have a high risk of taking illicit drugs, developing sexually transmitted infections (STIs), unintended pregnancy, depression, suicide attempts, and sexual exploitation. Greater proportions of runaway youths experience clinically significant post-traumatic stress disorder than normative youths. Trauma generally begins with runaway youth's experiences within the family and is increased by prolonged traumatic events. The likelihood of depression among female runaways is typically related to family conflict and communication. Depression in male runaways is typically related to paternal alcohol use disorder and poor family relationships. Negative interactions in relationships within the family appear to greatly influence depressive symptoms for both genders.

Runaways in international contexts

Hong Kong

In Hong Kong, 51.1 percent of at-risk youth identified by social workers have been a runaway during the age range of 11 to 18.

India
 
Approximately 47 million runaway and homeless adolescents are estimated to be on the streets of India. Studies have shown a higher prevalence of adolescent boys running away than adolescent girls.

Familial respect is important in India. Much of the Indian runaway population describes themselves as young people doing everything right at home, but having received harsh treatment from family members all throughout life. Mistreatment consists of anything from favoring one child over another to extreme abuse.

Mainland China
Social control theory describes the runaway situation in China. Adolescent friendships can interfere with positive influences parents place in the adolescent's life. According to the Chinese National Bureau of Statistics, approximately 150,000 runaway children and youth were documented in 2006. Unrealistic expectations of school has caused many adolescents to run away. Many runaways are low achievers who reported they were constantly criticized by their teachers and experienced their teachers indifferent attitude toward them. Overbearing parents authoritarian, overprotective, and neglectful styles have led to adolescents running away.

United States

In the United States, a runaway is a minor who leaves home without permission and stays away either overnight (14 years old and younger or older and mentally incompetent) or away from home two nights (15 or over) and chooses not to come home when expected to return. A runaway is different from child abandonment or a "throwaway" youth. Runaway youth are evenly divided male and female, although girls are more likely to seek help through shelters and hotlines. In the United States, runaway children or youth are widely regarded as a chronic and serious social problem. It is estimated that each year, there are between 1.3 and 1.5 million runaway and homeless youth in the United States

Running away from home is considered a crime in some jurisdictions, but it is usually a status offense punished with probation, or not punished at all. Giving aid or assistance to a runaway instead of turning them in to the police is a more serious crime called "harboring a runaway", and is typically a misdemeanor. The law can vary considerably from one jurisdiction to another; in the United States, there is a different law in every state. A 2003 FBI study showed that there were 123,581 arrests for runaway youths in the United States.

The Family and Youth Services Bureau of the United States Department of Health and Human Services funds grant programs to help runaway and homeless youth. The organization also provides funding for the National Runaway Switchboard, a national hotline for runaway youth, youth who are thinking about running away or are in crisis, parents, and other concerned adults.

Notable runaways 

 Isa Hasan al-Yasiri – (1942), Iraqi-Canadian poet. When he was ten years old, he ran away from school without the knowledge of his family to the village of his maternal uncles. He traveled there with a caravan of camels, walking with them all night long. He stated years later at the age of 74  that he had defined his childhood self-concept based on freedom.

See also
 International Centre for Missing & Exploited Children
 Refugee children
 Street children
 Dawn: Portrait of a Teenage Runaway
 Child abandonment – children whose parents remove them from the home or refuse to allow them to live at home
 Disownment – declaring that a child is no longer part of the family

References

Further reading
 Brennan, Tim, David Huizinga, and Delbert S. Elliott. The social psychology of runaways. Lexington, MA: Lexington Books, 1978. .
 Fernandes-Alcantara, Adrienne L. Runaway and Homeless Youth: Demographics and Programs. Washington, D.C.: Congressional Research Service, 26 April 2018.
 Janus, Mark-David. Adolescent runaways: causes and consequences. Lexington, MA: Lexington Books, 1987. .
 Goldberg, Jim. Raised by wolves.  Zurich and New York: Scalo, 1995. .
 Whitbeck, Les B., and Dan R. Hoyt. Nowhere to grow: homeless and runaway adolescents and their families. New York: Aldine de Grutyer, 1999. .
 Gwartney, Debra. Live through this: a mother's memoir of runaway daughters and reclaimed love. Boston: Houghton Mifflin Harcourt, 2009. .

External links
 National Runaway Switchboard for young people in the United States and U.S. Territories
 The Runaway Helpline for young people in the United Kingdom
 Family and Youth Services Bureau
 National Clearinghouse on Families & Youth

 
Adoption, fostering, orphan care and displacement
Children's street culture
Street children